Garden City Union Free School District is headquartered at 56 Cathedral Avenue in Garden City, New York, 11530 (phone 516-478-1000).

The Garden City Union Free School District is rated 14th in New York and 44th overall in the country.

Schools
Garden City High School
Garden City Middle School
Stewart School
Stratford School
Homestead Schools
Locust School
Hemlock School

External links
 
Great Schools data

Garden City, New York
Education in Nassau County, New York
School districts in New York (state)